Kokopelli is a Native American fertility deity. 

Kokopelli may also refer to:

Kokopelli Records, a record label created by jazz musician Herbie Mann
Kokopelli (album), a 2003 album by the band Kosheen
Kokopelli Trail, a trail in Colorado and Utah
Kokopelli Winery, Arizona
Association Kokopelli, a non-profit organization based in France involved in the protection of biodiversity, medicinal plants and the production of organic seeds
Kokopelli Seed Foundation, a North American organization involved in providing access to open-pollinated seeds
Kokopelli, a major character in the Bokurano manga and anime
Kokopelli, a cartoon character who appeared in early additions of Muse Magazine.